The GAZ-3105 is an automobile manufactured by the Gorkovsky Avtomobilny Zavod (GAZ, Gorky Automobile Plant) from 1992 to 1996.

History
During the late 1980s GAZ developed a concept car for a future replacement for both the business GAZ-3102 Volga and the luxury limousine GAZ-14 Chaika. The GAZ-3102 itself was envisioned as interim project that would fill the void created by the exclusiveness of the GAZ-14 Chaika. The new car would leave ZiL to handle the upper class. However the resulting GAZ-3105, which was never to be part of the Volga family, as it would be produced on the Chaika's conveyor (presently still used for the GAZ-3102) due to the economic problems never reached production.

GAZ set out to design a new generation of front-, rear- and all-wheel drive cars, representing the family GAZ-3103, GAZ-3104 and GAZ-3105 respectively. Influenced by the Audi 100, the family was to replace the 1960s Volga cars, both GAZ-24-10 and GAZ-3102. The vehicles featured MacPherson strut suspension, V8 engine with fuel injection, and CV front and rear axles.

The hard economic crises that the post-Soviet Russia was faced with meant that GAZ had no means to launch the cars into production. Originally GAZ hoped to re-launch its GAZ-3103 family nonetheless, but as the years went, and despite the economy improving, its mid-1980s exterior design became archaic.

As a result, the factory went to length in creating a new exterior and the "second generation" GAZ-3103 was first shown at the 1996 Moscow car show. However the archaic tooling on which the basic Volga was produced, was not up to standard on the technological level that the new car would require. Moreover, its price was well above the money that a Russian was willing to pay for a Volga. Thus in 1997 a compromise solution was developed, the GAZ-3111. Retaining most of the chassis architecture from the GAZ-3110 (single rear axle with leaf springs, A-bar front suspension, traditional propshaft drive, etc.), it nonetheless featured completely new body, influenced by the GAZ-3103 with retro-styling elements from the GAZ-21.

External links
 
 Призрак перестройки: история разработки и небытия ГАЗ-3105

Cars of Russia
GAZ Volga
Cars introduced in 1992